The Kerala Public Service Commission (KPSC) is a body created by the Constitution of India to select applicants for civil service jobs in the Indian state of Kerala according to the merits of the applicants and the rules of reservation.

The Head Office of the KPSC is located at Pattom, Thiruvananthapuram, the State Capital. It has three Regional Offices and fourteen District Offices.

The Union Public Service Commission is a body created by the Constitution of India. The Commission advise the Government on all matters relating to civil services referred to it under Article 320 (3) of the Constitution and publish notifications inviting applications for selection to various posts as per the requisitions of the appointing authorities, conduct written test and/or practical tests, physical efficiency test and interview, prepare ranked list based on the performance of the candidates and advise candidates for appointment strictly based on their merit and observing the rules of reservation as and when vacancies are reported.

History
In 1923, the Indian Government established a Public Service Commission to examine the salary structure of the Indian Civil Service and the possibility of transferring some of the duties to provincial services. The commission was composed of five Englishmen and four Indians, with Viscount Lee of Fareham serving as chairman. 

The commission also addressed the rate of Indianisation of the Indian Civil Service and the Indian Police. It determined a rate which in 15 years would make the Indian Civil Service with a 50% Indian membership and the same in 25 years for the Indian Police. 

It was left largely to the discretion of provincial governments to recruit and exercise control over their services, as deemed proper. As a result of the discretionary powers left to provincial Government, the Government of Madras and Punjab proposed to set up their own public service commissions. 

Madras Presidency was the first province in India to establish their own service commission when the Madras Service Commission was established under an Act of the Madras Legislature in 1929, which included more than half of the present-day state of Kerala (Malabar District and South Canara).

There was a Public Service Commissioner in the erstwhile Travancore state whose duty was to select candidates for direct recruitment to various categories of posts under the Government. G.D. Nokes was appointed as the first Public Service Commissioner on 14 June 1936. The Office of the Public Service Commissioner, Travancore continued to function till the integration of Travancore and Cochin States.

In Cochin there was a Staff Selection Board constituted in 1936 to select candidates for initial recruitment to lower posts. In 1947 a three-member Cochin Public Service Commission was constituted under an Act of the State Legislature.

The Travancore-Cochin State was formed on 1 July 1949 by the integration of the two Princely States of Travancore and Cochin. With the integration of the States of Travancore and Cochin on 1 July 1949 a Public Service Commission for the State of Travancore-Cochin was constituted by an Ordinance. There were three members on the Commission including the Chairman. The functions of the Travancore-Cochin Public Service Commission were generally the same as those laid down in the Government of India Act, 1935. Later, when the Constitution of India came into force on 26 January 1950, the Travancore-Cochin Public Service Commission continued to function under the Constitutional Provisions.

The State of Kerala was formed on 1 November 1956 consequent on the Reorganisation of States. It comprises the former Travancore-Cochin State (except the present Kanyakumari District and Shencottah Taluk of the present Tamil Nadu) and the Malabar District and the Kasargod Taluk of South Kanara District of the then composite Madras State. The public service commissions of Malabar District and South Canara were separated from Madras PSC.

With the formation of the State of Kerala on 1 November 1956 as a result of the reorganisation of States, the Travancore-Cochin Public Service Commission was transformed into the Kerala Public Service Commission. V.K. Velayudhan was the 1st Chairman of Kerala Public Service Commission.  The number of the Members of the Commission was increased to Five in 1959, to Seven in 1971, to Eight in 1981, to Nine in 1982, to Thirteen in 1983, to Fourteen in 1984, to Fifteen in 1984 and to the present strength of Eighteen in 2005.

Duties and functions 
The duties and functions of the Commission have been laid down in Art. 320 of the constitution of India and Kerala Public Service Commission Rules of Procedure ( come into force from 16th day of August 1976)

Recruitment to services & posts under the state through conduct of competitive examinations. This is the regular mode of recruitment where an examination is conducted followed by an interview. 
Recruitment to services & posts under the Kerala Government by direct selection. This type of recruitment is done to fill immediate/ irregular job vacancies. It is general done through direct interviews, but sometimes, a written test is conducted preceding the interview.
Advising on the suitability of officers for appointment on promotion as well as transfer-on-deputation
Advising the Government on all matters relating to methods of Recruitment to various services and posts
Disciplinary cases relating to different civil services and
Miscellaneous matters relating to grant of extra ordinary pensions, reimbursement of legal expenses etc. ..
Kerala PSC advising the government to appoint qualified professional for various posts, through rank list which is created by PSC from top scorers in written, practical and physical examinations.

Present commission 
Chairman: Dr. M R Baiju
Members
R Parvathi Devi
Sureshan C 
Dr. Ginu Zacharia Oommen
G Rajendarn
Dr. K P Sajilal
T R Anil Kumar
Mohammed Musthafa Kadambot
P H Muhammed Ismail
Roshen Roy Mathew
Vijaya Kumar P K
Dr. Sreekumar S
S Vijayakumaran Nair
S A Saif
Abdul Samad V T K
Dr. C K Shajib
Dr. Stany Thonams
Dr. Mini Sacharias
Boni Kuriakose

Secretary: Saju George

See also
 Union Public Service Commission
 Public sector undertakings in Kerala
 Unemployment in Kerala
 List of Public service commissions in India

References

http://thulasi.psc.kerala.gov.in/thulasi

https://www.deccanherald.com/national/south/kpsc-suspects-cheating-in-recruitment-test-752392.html

http://www.newindianexpress.com/states/kerala/2019/aug/14/misinterpreting-request-as-order-psc-gave-illegal-weightage-for-4-decades-2018543.html

External links
Kerala Public Service Commission

State agencies of Kerala
State public service commissions of India
Government agencies established in 1956
Organisations based in Thiruvananthapuram
1956 establishments in Kerala